"Seven Wonders" is a song by British-American rock band Fleetwood Mac from their fourteenth studio album, Tango in the Night (1987). Stevie Nicks sang lead vocals on the song, and it was written by Sandy Stewart, with contributed lyrics by Nicks. 

In the song, the singer remembers a love affair from her past. She sings that even if she should live to see the Seven Wonders of the World, doing so would not compare to the beauty of that romance. The song was released in June 1987, by Warner Bros. Records, as the second single from Tango in the Night. The song climbed to number 19 on the US Billboard Hot 100 on 15 August 1987.

The single was also available on the 12-inch single format, which included an extended remix, a dub mix and an instrumental, "Book of Miracles", which later became the track "Juliet" on Nicks' fourth solo studio album The Other Side of the Mirror (1989). A limited edition 12-inch picture disc version was also released in the United Kingdom.

In the accompanying music video, Nicks is singing in the center of a stage with the other members of Fleetwood Mac around her, playing their instruments and contributing vocals. On a background diorama, sketches of seven 'wonders' are pictured, including the Taj Mahal, the Roman Colosseum, and the Sphinx. Greek pillars are also placed around the stage.

Background and composition
Sandy Stewart wrote the song, recorded a demo, and sent it to band member Stevie Nicks without a lyric sheet. Nicks misheard one of the lines in the first verse as "all the way down to Emmaline", a contribution that gave her a writing credit alongside Stewart. Nicks later said, "I had become so attached to the name Emmaline that we kept it in and she gave me a small percentage."

Reception
Cash Box said that "Nicks’ distinctive raspy voice buzzes over the song’s tranquil lyrics and sterling production."

Appearances in other media
"The Seven Wonders", the season finale of American Horror Story: Coven, opened with Nicks performing the song. This helped the song to reach number 18 on the Billboard Rock Digital Songs chart with sales of 13,000.

Track listing and formats
US 7-inch vinyl single (Warner Bros. Records 7-28317)
 "Seven Wonders" – 3:38
 "Book of Miracles" (Instrumental) – 4:28

UK 12-inch vinyl single (Warner Bros. Records W8317T)
 "Seven Wonders" (Extended remix) – 6:37
 "Book of Miracles" (Instrumental) – 4:28
 "Seven Wonders" (Dub version) – 4:32

Personnel
Stevie Nicks – lead and backing vocals
Lindsey Buckingham – guitars, synthesizer, Fairlight CMI, backing vocals
Christine McVie – synthesizers, backing vocals
John McVie – bass guitar
Mick Fleetwood – drums, percussion

Charts

Weekly charts

Year-end charts

Certifications

References

1987 singles
Fleetwood Mac songs
1986 songs
Songs written by Stevie Nicks
Song recordings produced by Richard Dashut
Warner Records singles